Chionomesa is a genus of South American hummingbirds in the family Trochilidae.

Species
The genus contains two species:
Glittering-throated emerald, Chionomesa fimbriata
Sapphire-spangled emerald, Chionomesa lactea

These two species were formerly placed in the genus Amazilia. A molecular phylogenetic study published in 2014 found that Amazilia was polyphyletic. In the revised classification to create monophyletic genera, these species were moved to the resurrected genus Chionomesa that had been introduced in 1921 by the French naturalist Eugène Simon. The genus name combines the Ancient Greek khiōn meaning "snow" with mesos meaning "middle". The type species was designated as the sapphire-spangled emerald by the American ornithologist Charles Wallace Richmond in 1927.

References

Chionomesa
Bird genera